The Chapin National Bank Building is a historic bank building at 1675-1677 Main Street in Springfield, Massachusetts.  Built in 1917 for a bank founded in 1872 by Chester Chapin, it is a notable local example of Classical Revival architecture.  The building was listed on the National Register of Historic Places in 1983.  It now houses other commercial businesses.

Description and history
The Chapin National Bank Building is located in downtown Springfield, at the northeast corner of Main and Lyman Streets.  It is a two-story masonry structure, built out of cast stone.  The Lyman Street facade has a classical Doric frieze, with four monumental fluted columns set in antis.  The Main Street facade originally had a similar appearance, except for the main building entrance, but this has been obscured or replaced by modern paneling, leaving only the frieze below the roofline.

Chester Chapin, a native of nearby Ludlow, made a fortune first in stagecoach operations, and then in railroads and other businesses.  He founded a bank in 1872, which was formally chartered as Chapin National Bank in 1878.  Chapin was a city selectman and served a single term in the United States Congress (1875-77).  This building was built in 1917, on the site of a previous building of the same bank.  It was designed by Mowbray and Uffinger, architects from New York City, and remains a distinctive example of Classical Revival architecture in the city despite its facade alterations.

See also
National Register of Historic Places listings in Springfield, Massachusetts
National Register of Historic Places listings in Hampden County, Massachusetts

References

Bank buildings on the National Register of Historic Places in Massachusetts
Commercial buildings in Springfield, Massachusetts
National Register of Historic Places in Springfield, Massachusetts
1917 establishments in Massachusetts